A total solar eclipse will occur on Sunday, April 20, 2042. A solar eclipse occurs when the Moon passes between Earth and the Sun, thereby totally or partly obscuring the image of the Sun for a viewer on Earth. A total solar eclipse occurs when the Moon's apparent diameter is larger than the Sun's, blocking all direct sunlight, turning day into darkness. Totality occurs in a narrow path across Earth's surface, with the partial solar eclipse visible over a surrounding region thousands of kilometres wide.
It will be seen significantly in Western Indonesia (particularly in Sumatra), Eastern Malaysia, Brunei and the Philippines.

Images 
Animated path

Related eclipses

Solar eclipses of 2040–2043

Saros 139

Inex series

Metonic series

References

External links 
 http://eclipse.gsfc.nasa.gov/SEplot/SEplot2001/SE2042Apr20T.GIF

2042 03 20
2042 in science
2042 03 20
2042 03 20